Crossed Lines may refer to:

Crossed Lines (album), 2004 album by Australian rock band 78 Saab
Crossed Lines (film), 2007 Chinese anthology film